Macheboeuf is a French surname. Notable people with the surname include:

 Joseph Projectus Machebeuf (1812–1889), French Bishop of Denver
 Michel Macheboeuf (1900–1953), French biochemist

French-language surnames